Telugu Desam Party, Telangana (Telangana TDP), is a state unit of the Telugu Desam Party in state of Telangana. The headquarters is located in Hyderabad, the capital of the state. The party appointed Kasani Gnaneshwar Mudiraj as the president of the Telangana TDP and currently, he has been serving to this position since November 2022.

Telangana TDP won 15 seats in the 1st Telangana Legislative Assembly election, held in 2014.

History 
After the formation of Telangana, TDP, in alliance with Bharatiya Janata Party (BJP), fought the 2014 Legislative Assembly election. TDP won 15 seats in the newly formed Telangana Legislative Assembly. TDP also won a Lok Sabha seat from Malkajgiri Lok Sabha constituency in the simultaneously held 2014 Indian general election.

In the 2016 Hyderabad civic polls, TDP won one councillor seat out of 150 seats. In the 2018 Telangana Legislative Assembly election, TDP won two seats in the 119-member state Assembly, both the seats in Khammam district. It had contested 2018 assembly elections in an alliance with Indian National Congress.

After the bifurcation, Telugu Desham Party created two units for both Telugu states. L. Ramana was appointed as the first president of the Telangana unit of TDP in 2015 and served till July 19, 2021. In July 2021, Telangana TDP appointed Bakkani Narasimhulu as the president.

In November 2022, Kasani Gnaneshwar Mudiraj, a former MLC and BC leader, was appointed as the president of Telangana TDP by N. Chandrababu Naidu. Kasani, who served as the MLC from undivided Andhra Pradesh, has served as the national president of Mudiraj Mahasabha and had a good hold in the BC community. Under his leadership, the party was revived in the state and has started actively participating in various public gatherings and rallies in Telangana.

Leadership

Telangana TDP Presidents

Electoral performance

Legislative Assembly elections

Lok Sabha elections

Activities 
On December 21, 2022, the party organized a large public gathering in Khammam district of Telangana to re-energize the party cadre. It was attended by TDP chief N Chandrababu Naidu and TTDP president Kasani Gnaneshwar Mudiraj. A huge crowd attended the gathering held at the Sardar Patel Stadium in Khammam. While addressing the gathering, Chandrababu Naidu appealed to those who quit the party to join other political parties to return to regain the party's past glory. After 2018, it was the first time that TDP organized a show of strength in Telangana.

See also 
 Politics of Telangana
 Telangana Legislative Assembly
 Telugu Desam Party

References

Political parties established in 2014
Telangana
Politics of Telangana
Political parties in Telangana
Liberal parties in Asia
Liberal parties in India
Regionalist parties in India
Populist parties